Francesco d'Errico (born 24 September 1957 in Foggia, Italy) is an archaeologist who works as CNRS Director of Research at the University of Bordeaux in France and Professor at the Centre for Early Sapiens Behaviour, University of Bergen. In 2014 he was awarded the CNRS silver medal. In 2015 Giorgio Napolitano, president of Italy, presented him with the Fabio-Frassetto prize from the Accademia dei Lincei.

His research interests focus on the origins of modern behaviour in Hominins and specifically the emergence of cultural innovations in the African Middle Stone Age and the transition between Neanderthal and Cro-Magnon cultures.

Education and career 
d'Errico was born in Foggia, Italy and at the age of seven he was already searching for archaeological remains, in this case flint-stones, in the Puglia region of south-east Italy. His early education was at Liceo Classico Massimo d'Azeglio in Turin.

He completed a MA in Archaeology and Anthropology at the University of Turin in 1982 followed by a DEA in Prehistory and Quaternary geology at the University of Paris in 1985. During this time he was a fellow of the Italian Ministry of Research at the Institut de Paléontologie Humaine, Paris.

In 1986 d'Errico completed his Diploma di Specializzazione in Archeologia Preistorica at the University of Pisa and in 1987 he was visiting professor at the Muséum national d'histoire naturelle, Institut de Paléontologie Humaine, Paris. He completed his PhD in prehistory and quaternary geology at Muséum national d'histoire naturelle in Paris in 1989.

In 1991 he was employed as a contract researcher at Monrepos Archäologisches Forschungszentrum und Museum für menschliche Verhaltensevolution in Neuwied, Germany.

In 1992 d'Errico worked as a postdoctoral fellow at the Consejo Superior de Investigaciones Científicas, Madrid and from 1992-1993 he was a postdoctoral fellow at the University of Cambridge, England. In 1994 he was appointed research associate at the McDonald Institute for Archaeological Research of the University of Cambridge and joined the CNRS at the University of Bordeaux's De la Préhistoire à l’Actuel: Culture, Environnement et Anthropologie (PACEA) laboratory.

In 1999 d'Errico worked as a visiting professor at the University of the Witwatersrand (WITS), South Africa and between 2015 and 2017 he was a Professorial Fellow at the DST-NRF Centre of Excellence in Palaeoscience in the Evolutionary Studies Institute at WITS.

In 2003/4 d'Errico was Research Professor at the department of Anthropology of George Washington University in Washington, D.C. In 2003 he completed Habilitation à diriger des Recherches  at the University of Bordeaux. In 2007 d'Errico was visiting professor at the department of Anthropology, Princeton University, New Jersey and between 2011 and 2015 he was associate professor at the Department of Archaeology at the University of Bergen.

Since 2017 he has held a professorship at the Centre for Early Sapiens Behaviour at the University of Bergen.

Other fellowships 
 1987-1988 Fellow of the Fyssen Foundation, Paris. Awarded for "Analysis of new modes of expression of the beginning of the post-glacial period by the microscopic study of Azilian engraved pebbles."
 1990-1991 Fellow of the NATO Science Program, Paris

Research interests 
d'Errico has worked in 17 countries, including China, Botswana, Morocco, the United States, the Netherlands and South Africa. His research has indicated that jewelry, engravings, pigments and tools made from bones were used in Northern and Southern Africa at least  years ago, which is earlier than the previously accepted scenarios for the development of modern behaviour.

Some of his research interests are the evolution of human cognitive abilities as evidenced by the use of bone tools and symbolism, including grave goods used during burial rituals in the Paleolithic period and systems of notation from the same time period. He has studied the extinction of Neanderthals and their relations with the modern humans that replaced them; and the role climate change had on human evolution.

Research at Border Cave in South Africa, conducted with Lucinda Backwell and other colleagues, showed that beads, bone tools and other artefacts reminiscent of those used by San hunter-gatherers were already present in southern Africa  years ago.

Current research 
In 2019, d'Errico and his colleague Lucinda Backwell were collaborating on a book on the ethnoarchaeology of the San people from the Kalahari. The book is the result of the examination of San artefacts, collected by Louis Fourie between 1916 and 1928, by four San elders and their descriptions of the manufacture, use and meaning of these items.

Selected publications 
d'Errico has authored or co-authored 6 books:
 
 
 
 
 
 

In 2019, Google Scholar listed more than  citations for Francesco d'Errico and ResearchGate listed more than 330 research publications and more than  citations. Selected publications include:
 d’Errico, F. et P. Villa, 1997. Holes and grooves. The contribution of microscopy and taphonomy to the problem of art origins. Journal of Human Evolution. 33, 1-31.
 .
 d’Errico F., Ch. Henshilwood, G. Lawson, M. Vanhaeren, A.-M. Tillier, M. Soressi, F. Bresson,  B. Maureille, A. Nowell, J. Lakarra, L. Backwell, M. Julien. 2003. Archaeological evidence for the origins of language, symbolism and music. An alternative multidisciplinary perspective. Journal of World Prehistory 17 : 1-70.
 
 d’Errico F., Henshilwood Ch, Vanhaeren, M., Karen van Niekerk, K. 2005. Nassarius kraussianus shell beads from Blombos Cave: Evidence for Symbolic Behaviour in the Middle Stone Age. Journal of Human Evolution 48, 3-24.
 
 d’Errico F., Backwell L., Villa P., Degano I., Lucejko J.J, Bamford M.K., Higham, T., Colombini M.-P., Beaumont P.B. 2012. Early evidence of San material culture represented by organic artifacts from Border Cave, South Africa. Proc Natl Acad Sci USA, vol. 109 no. 33, 13214-13219.

Documentaries 
d'Errico has featured in several documentaries and interviews, including the following. The complete list can be found on his webpage at the University of Bordeaux.

Recognition 
 In 2015 Giorgio Napolitano, president of Italy, presented d'Errico with the Fabio-Frassetto prize from the Accademia dei Lincei.
 In 2014 he was awarded the CNRS silver medal.
 Since 2014 d'Errico was included in list of Highly Cited Researchers by Clarivate Analytics.
 He is the most cited Italian researcher in the field of Humanities according to TopItalianScientists.org.

References

External links 

Living people
1957 births
21st-century Italian scientists
20th-century Italian scientists
Italian archaeologists
Academic staff of the University of Bordeaux
People from Foggia
University of Turin alumni
University of Paris alumni
University of Pisa alumni
Italian expatriates in France
Research directors of the French National Centre for Scientific Research